Yoker Athletic Football Club are a Scottish football club based in Clydebank near Glasgow. Yoker is an area of Glasgow adjacent to Clydebank, however Yoker's stadium lies just outside the Glasgow boundary. Nicknamed the Whe Ho, the club were formed in 1886 and are based at Holm Park.

Local rivals Clydebank entered the Junior grade in 2003–04 and ground shared with Yoker at Holm Park from 2008 until 2018 after leaving their ground in Duntocher. Yoker were promoted to Central Division One on 23 April 2011 after an 8–0 victory over Newmains United.

The team was co-managed since January 2019 by Peter McKenna and Tommy Montgomery, Gordon Robertson took over as manager in 2022.

Yoker Athletic can boast of a mention in Scottish literature and film; James Kelman's novel, A Disaffection, has the main character attending a match at Holm Park, while the club is also mentioned briefly in an episode of Scottish cult classic Limmy's Show.

Ground

The club play at Holm Park which they share with Clydebank. It is a council-owned ground with floodlights and a synthetic pitch.

Honours
Scottish Junior Cup
 Winners: 1932–33
 Runners-up: 1935–36, 2021-22
Central League Division 1
 Runners-up (Promoted to Super First): 2011–12

Central League Second Division
 Winners: 2010–11

Central League Division Two
 Winners: 1988–89

Other honours
 West of Scotland Cup winners: 1930–31
 Glasgow Dryburgh Cup: 1947–48
 Central (Beatons Coaches) Sectional League Cup: 1985–86
 Central League Cup - Runners-up 2016–17

References

External links
 Website 

 
Scottish Junior Football Association clubs
Football clubs in Scotland
Football in West Dunbartonshire
Association football clubs established in 1886
1886 establishments in Scotland
Clydebank
West of Scotland Football League teams